European route E 64 is a series of roads in Italy, part of the United Nations International E-road network.

It runs from Turin to Brescia, both in Italy.

Firstly it leaves Turin (in Piedmont), heading northeast into Lombardy and passing through Milan. It then continues north-east until it reaches its final destination of Brescia.

Connections with other E-roads 
 At Turin, it connects to the E 70, the E 612, and the E 717.
 Upon reaching Milan, it makes a connection to both the E 35 and the E 62.
 When it finishes at Brescia, it links with European Route E 70.

External links 
 UN Economic Commission for Europe: Overall Map of E-road Network (2007)

64
E064